Pietro Zoppas (27 April 1934 – 17 June 2020) was an Italian racing cyclist. He won stage 9 of the 1964 Giro d'Italia.

Major results
1956
 1st Trofeo Città di San Vendemiano
1957
 1st La Popolarissima
1960
 8th Coppa Sabatini
1961
 5th Milano–Vignola
1964
 1st Stage 9 Giro d'Italia

References

External links
 

1934 births
2020 deaths
Italian male cyclists
Italian Giro d'Italia stage winners
People from Conegliano
Cyclists from the Province of Treviso